Theodor Nussbaum (Nußbaum in German) (July 3, 1885 – April 22, 1956) was a German architect. In 1936 he won a bronze medal in the art competitions of the Olympic Games for his "Kölner Stadtplan und Sportanlagen" ("Municipal Planning and Sporting Centre in Cologne").

References

External links
 profile

1885 births
1956 deaths
20th-century German architects
Olympic bronze medalists in art competitions
Medalists at the 1936 Summer Olympics
Olympic competitors in art competitions